The men's ice hockey tournament at the 1952 Winter Olympics in Oslo, Norway, was the seventh Olympic Championship, also serving as the 19th World Championships and the 30th European Championships. The tournament was mainly played at the Jordal Amfi Arena, as well as the stadiums at Dælenenga (in Oslo), Kadettangen (Sandvika), Marienlyst (Drammen) and Lillestrøm (Lillestrøm). Canada, represented by the Edmonton Mercurys, won its sixth Olympic gold medal and 15th World Championship.  Highest finishing European team Sweden won the bronze medal and its sixth European Championship.

The tournament was nearly not played at all.  Discussions began in 1950, whether or not ice hockey would be included in the 1952 Winter Olympics. The International Olympic Committee (IOC) sought assurance that participating teams would adhere to its amateur code rather than the International Ice Hockey Federation (IIHF) code, and also wanted to exclude IIHF president Fritz Kraatz from negotiations. IIHF past-president W. G. Hardy, and secretary George Dudley agreed there would be no negotiations on those terms, nor would they repudiate Kraatz. Dudley expected the IIHF to discuss having its own 1952 Ice Hockey World Championships instead, and stated that the Olympics would be a financial failure without the inclusion of hockey. In 1951 it was decided to drop hockey from the Olympic programme because of the controversies surrounding the 1948 Games.  However, at the IOC congress in Romania the same year, it was reinstated. W. G. Hardy advocated for the inclusion of the Soviet Union national ice hockey team, provided there is no political interference.  Despite his advocacy the Soviet authorities did not apply in time to be included in the tournament.

Teams from Germany and Czechoslovakia rejoined the top level of international hockey this year.  Nine nations played a round-robin with the top three nations receiving medals at the end. Swiss newspapers criticized the rough play by Canada and the United States team, and questioned whether hockey should be part of the Olympics. Canadian Amateur Hockey Association president Doug Grimston felt the games were tame compared to North American standards and that the Olympics would suffer without hockey which was its biggest attraction.

After Canada and the United States played to a draw in the final game of the round-robin, which placed the teams first and second respectively in the standings for the gold and silver medals. Had Canada won, the United States would have placed fourth. A newspaper in Moscow charged that a deal had been made to predetermine the outcome and assure the United States of a silver medal and to exclude the Czechoslovakia team from a medal. Canada won their sixth Olympic title, and fifteenth World title.  The USA finished one point ahead of both Sweden and Czechoslovakia who both finished with six wins and two losses, additionally, they had an equal goal differential of +29.  The Czechoslovaks had defeated the Swedes four to nothing on the final day, and believed that they had won the Olympic bronze, and the European Championship.  However, organizers decided that they should play a final tie-breaking game, in which the Swedes overcame a three-goal deficit to win five to three.

Qualification

The 1952 Olympic tournament, also the 1952 World Championship, “Category A,” was open to all teams assigned by the IIHF to Category A for 1952.  This was the first Olympic tournament with any type of qualification procedure.

For the purpose of maximizing fan interest and minimizing lopsided games, the IIHF announced in September 1950 a new system to separate teams into Categories A and B for the World Championships, starting in 1951.  If not otherwise qualified, the Olympic host nation was guaranteed assignment to Category A for 1951 and 1952.

Teams were assigned to Category A for 1951 that

 Earned a minimum of three points at both the 1949 and 1950 World Championships.
 Earned a minimum of three points at either the 1949 or 1950 World Championships and did not play in the other.
 Did not play at the 1949 and 1950 World Championships, but were selected at IIHF discretion upon entering the 1951 World Championship.

All other teams that played at any of the World Championships from 1949 to 1951 were assigned to Category B for 1951.  Because of a rule that required a team to win two consecutive Category B tournaments to earn promotion to Category A, all of these 1951 Category B teams were eliminated from Olympic qualification.

Teams were assigned to Category A for 1952 that

 Earned a minimum of two points at the 1951 World Championship, Category A.
 Earned entry into the 1951 World Championship, Category A, but did not play.
 Did not play at the 1949, 1950 or 1951 World Championships, but were selected at IIHF discretion upon entering the 1952 World Championship.

Teams were assigned to Category B for 1952 that

 Were assigned to Category B for 1951.
 Earned less that two points at the 1951 World Championship, Category A.
 Did not play at the 1949, 1950 and 1951 World Championships and were not selected for Category A at IIHF discretion upon entering the 1952 World Championship.

Great Britain qualified for the 1952 Olympic tournament according to this procedure, but announced they would not play in late 1951, and instead requested entry into the Category B tournament. They planned to enter a team composed of English players only and did not expect them to be competitive at the Olympics.

Medalists

Participating nations

World Championships Group A (Norway)

An additional game was played between Sweden and Czechoslovakia because they finished tied for a medal place on points (12) and goal difference (+29).

Final round

World Championship Group B (Belgium)
Played in Liege 15–22 March 1952.  British manager Johnny Murray won with a roster composed entirely with English players; no Scots or Canadians.

Table

Statistics

Average age
Team Germany was the oldest team in the tournament, averaging 27 years and 10 months. Team Norway was the youngest team in the tournament, averaging 23 years and 9 months. Gold medalists Canada averaged 26 years and 5 months. Tournament average was 25 years and 8 months.

Top scorers

European Championship medal table

Citations

References

 Jeux Olympiques d'Oslo 1952
 Ishockey VM OS 1947-1954

 
1952 Winter Olympics events
1952
Olympics
1952
1952